Garth, Ceredigion is a small village in the  community of Trefeurig, Ceredigion, Wales, which is 74.6 miles (120.1 km) from Cardiff and 176.3 miles (283.7 km) from London. Garth is represented in the  Senedd by Elin Jones (Plaid Cymru) and is part of the Ceredigion constituency in the House of Commons.

References

See also
List of localities in Wales by population

Villages in Ceredigion